Ernest Jacques Cadgene (March 31, 1879 – February 4, 1934) was a French-American businessman and expert on silk dyes.

He was born in Lyons on March 31, 1879.  He obtained qualifications in chemistry from the University of Zurich, and worked for his father's company in Lyons.  In 1904 he emigrated to the US, working for Weidmannn Silk Dyeing Company in Paterson.  In 1906 he and Herman Simon started a company together, Cadgene Silk Dyeing and Finishing, but resigned in 1912, and joined Lyons Piece Dye Works, also in Paterson.  Simon subsequently sued Cadgene, claiming that Cadgene had persuaded all their customers to transfer their business to Lyons Piece Dye Works.  The new company became "one of the largest silk dyeing companies in the world".

He married his wife, Marie Pervilhac, on July 28, 1909. In 1932, his  estate in Englewood Cliffs, on The Palisades, was put up for sale, valued at about $2.5 million (equivalent to $ million in ).

He died of a heart attack on February 4, 1934, at his home in Englewood Cliffs.  He was survived by his wife, and five children: Jacques, Henry, George, Simone, and Marie Yvonne.

References 

1879 births
1934 deaths
French emigrants to the United States
People from Englewood Cliffs, New Jersey
People from Lyon
University of Zurich alumni